Sirohi Road railway station is also known as Pindwara railway station is located in Pindwara town of Sirohi district in Rajasthan. It serves Sirohi town and Pindwara town. It has two platforms. Its code is 'PDWA'. Express and Superfast trains halt here.

Initially, the name of the railway station was Sirohi Road. The name was changed to  Pindwara railway station on 31 October 2017, after railway passengers were confused by the name Sirohi Road.

Trains

 Chennai Egmore–Jodhpur Superfast Express
 Hazur Sahib Nanded–Shri Ganganagar Express
 Rajkot–Delhi Sarai Rohilla Weekly Express
 Bhavnagar Terminus–Delhi Sarai Rohilla Link Express
 Bandra Terminus–Delhi Sarai Rohilla Express
 Bandra Terminus–Hisar Superfast Express
 Suryanagri Express
 Dadar–Ajmer Superfast Express
 Ranakpur Express
 Mysore–Ajmer Express
 Valsad–Jodhpur Weekly Express
 Sabarmati–Ajmer Intercity Express
 Amrapur Aravali Express
 Yoga Express
 Ahmedabad–Kolkata Express
 Puri–Ajmer Express
 Ahmedabad–Lucknow Weekly Express

References

Railway stations in Sirohi district
Ajmer railway division